Whispered and Shouted is the second studio album released by Contemporary Christian musician, Aaron Shust. It was released on June 5, 2007 and debuted at No. 151 on the Billboard 200.

Background
Aaron Shust said of the meaning behind the album's title; "I chose the title for the project as I considered how God reveals himself to us. He whispers in the wind and shouts in the waves that he loves us and hears us."

Release
Whispered and Shouted was released in the United States on June 5, 2007. It debuted at No. 151 on the Billboard 200 and No. 17 on Billboard's Top Independent Albums chart. The first single released from the album was the song, "Give Me Words to Speak".

Track listing
All songs written by Aaron Shust, except when noted. 
"Long Live the King" - 4:59
"Like I Never Felt Before" - 3:42
"Create Again" (Shust, Dan Hannon) - 5:03
"Watch Over Me" - 5:12
"Give Me Words to Speak" - 4:28
"Life Itself" - 5:16
"The Name of Jesus" - 4:09
"I Will Wait" - 4:06
"Runaway" - 4:09
"Can't Hide From Your Love" (Shust, Jason Ingram) - 4:48
"Come to Me" - 3:12
"Worthy/Let All I Do" - 6:05

Accolades

In 2008, the album was nominated for a Dove Award for Pop/Contemporary Album of the Year at the 39th GMA Dove Awards.

References

2007 albums
Aaron Shust albums